The following is the list of squads for each of the 8 teams competing in the EuroBasket 1989, held in Yugoslavia between 20 and 25 June 1989. Each team selected a squad of 12 players for the tournament.

Group A

Italy

Netherlands

Soviet Union

Spain

Group B

Bulgaria

France

Greece

Yugoslavia

References
 1989 European Championship for Men, FIBA.com.
 European Championship 1989 - National Squads, LinguaSport.com.

1989